Bassett Creek may refer to:

Bassett Creek (Crystal, Minnesota), a neighborhood of Crystal, Minnesota
Bassett Creek (Mississippi River tributary), Minnesota, a tributary of the Mississippi River
Bassett Creek (Tombigbee River tributary), Alabama